Asterius of Cappadocia (Ἀστέριος; died c. 341) was an Arian Christian theologian from Cappadocia.  Few of his writings have been recovered in their entirety; the latest edition is by Markus Vinzent). He is said to have been a pupil of Lucian of Antioch, but it is unclear to what extent this was the case. He is said to have relapsed into paganism during the persecution under Maximian in 304 and thus, though received again into the church by Lucian and supported by the Eusebian party, never attained to ecclesiastical office. He was present at the synod of Antioch in 341.

Fragments of his Syntagmation are preserved by Athanasius of Alexandria and Marcellus of Ancyra.
His extant works include a commentary on the Psalms, a letter to Eusebius, the Syntagmation, and a few fragments.

Asterius was a firm defender of Arianism and Eusebius of Caesarea's theology, emphasising the derivative nature of the Son as a spontaneous manifestation and generation of the Father's will.

Notes

341 deaths
4th-century Christian theologians
Arian Christians
4th-century Romans
4th-century writers
4th-century Arian Christians
Cappadocia (Roman province)
Year of birth unknown
People from Cappadocia